Toshinosuke Takegahara is a Japanese shoe designer. His date of birth is not published.

“foot the coacher”,“AUTHENTIC SHOE & Co.”, “BEAUTIFUL SHOES”,
“SPECTUSSHOECO.”, and “FOOTSTOCK ORIGINALS®” are his private brand.

He began self-taught shoe design while a student at an arts university.

In 1994, he established the dress shoe brand "Toshinosuke Takegahara " (currently, "AUTHENTIC SHOE & Co.").

Visited England and collaborated with English shoe manufacturers “GEORGE COX” and “GRENSON.” Engaged in production at “Tricker’s.”

In 2004, his shoes were inducted into the Northampton Museum of Art’s permanent collection.

As he strongly dislikes exposure, his portraits have not appeared in magazines or on the web since his shooting by photographer Kishin Shinoyama in 2007.

Biography

 1994 - Established the dress shoe brand, Toshinosuke Takegahara.
 1996 - Collaborated with “GEORGE COX” in England.
 1998 - Relocates to England.
 1999 - Returns to Japan, re-establishes his “Toshinosuke Takegahara” brand.
 2000 - Launches flagship brand, foot the coacher. Also in charge at NUMBER (N)INE ’s shoe branch.
 2001 - Collaborated with “Paraboot” in France.
 2002 - Renames his “Toshinosuke Takegahara” brand as “AUTHENTIC SHOE & Co.” (same as company name).
 2003 - The release of Tricker’s by Toshinosuke Takegahara; In September he establishes the GALLERY OF AUTHENTIC showroom.
 2004/03 - His SETTA shoes are chosen ‘Shoe of the Month’ by England’s Northampton Museum and Art Gallery. These shoes later went on to be inducted into the museum’s permanent collection. Displayed works at the Dr. Martens Exhibition the same year.
 2006/06 - He has a hand in the production of ladies’ shoes for “SHOES and THINGS” and “ARTS & SCIENCE” with Sonya Park.
 2007/10 - Opens “foot the coacher” at Shinjuku’s Isetan.
 2009/10 - AUTHENTIC SHOE & Co. opens its flagship shop, GALLERY OF AUTHENTIC.
 2010 – Ladies’ shoe brand, BEAUTIFUL SHOES makes its debut. Worked on “TAKAHIROMIYASHITATheSoloist.” shoes. Announced ＜foot the coacher × NEW BALANCE＞ together with “NEW BALANCE” the same year.
 2011 - Involved in design of HELMUT LANG shoes.
 2012/01 - Personally debuts new brand “SPECTUSSHOECO.”  in Milano and Paris. Announced collaboration sandals together with “Chaco.”
 2013 - Debuts “foot the coacher by GRENSON” in collaboration with the English shoe brand GRENSON. Worked on “HYKE” and “SOPH.” shoes the same year.
 2014/07 - Debuts new shoe brand “FOOTSTOCK ORIGINALS®”  in Milano, Paris, and Tokyo.
 2015 - Announced “MM4” modeled after the actor Marcello Mastroianni from the Italian shoe brand “SUTORMANTELLASSI.”
 2016 - Announced ＜MOUNTAIN RESEARCH × SPECTUSSHOECO.＞ together with “MOUNTAIN RESEARCH.” Worked on “UNDERCOVER” shoes the same year.
 2018 - Announced ＜foot the coacher × inov8＞ together with the English trail running brand “inov8.” Worked on “ANREALAGE” shoes the same year. Announced ＜foot the coacher × STYLIST SHIBUTSU＞ together with “STYLIST SHIBUTSU” by the stylist, Koichiro Yamamoto the same year.

See also
foot the coacher

External links
 GALLERY OF AUTHENTIC
 FOOTSTOCK ORIGINALS
 Northampton Museum & Art Gallery is the home of the World Famous Shoe Collection | Northampton Borough Council

Shoe designers
Living people
Year of birth missing (living people)